The 2021 Louisville Cardinals men's soccer team represented the University of Louisville during the 2021 NCAA Division I men's soccer season.  The Cardinals were led by head coach John Michael Hayden, in his third season.  They played their home games at Lynn Stadium.  This was the team's 43rd season playing organized men's college soccer and their 8th playing in the Atlantic Coast Conference.

The Cardinals finished the season 10–7–1 overall and 5–3–0 in ACC play to finish in second place in the Atlantic Division.  As the fourth overall seed in the ACC Tournament the received a bye into the Quarterfinals, where they lost against fifth seed Notre Dame.  They received an at-large bid to the NCAA Tournament where they lost in the First Round to Bowling Green to end their season.

Background

The teams' 2020 season was significantly impacted by the COVID-19 pandemic, which curtailed the fall season and caused the NCAA Tournament to be played in Spring 2021. The ACC was one of the only two conferences in men's soccer to play in the fall of 2020.  The ACC also held a mini-season during the spring of 2021.

The Cardinals finished the fall season 1–6–1 and 1–4–1 in ACC play to finish in fifth place in the North Division.  They were not invited to the ACC Tournament.  They finished the spring season 4–2–0 and 4–2–0 in ACC play, to finish in second place in the Atlantic Division.  They were not invited to the NCAA Tournament.

Player movement

Players leaving

Players arriving

Squad

Roster

Team management

Source:

Schedule

Source:

|-
!colspan=6 style=""| Exhibition

|-
!colspan=6 style=""| Regular Season

|-
!colspan=6 style=""| ACC Tournament

|-
!colspan=6 style=""| NCAA Tournament

Awards and honors

2022 MLS SuperDraft

Source:

Rankings

References

2020
Louisville Cardinals
Louisville Cardinals
Louisville Cardinals men's soccer
Louisville